Thennavan is a 2003 Indian Tamil-language political action film written and directed by newcomer A. M. Nandakumar and produced by Vijayakanth, who played the title role Thennavan IAS, in-charge as the Chief Election Commissioner and fight against corrupt politicians. The musical score was by Yuvan Shankar Raja. The film was released on 15 August 2003, coinciding with India's Independence Day.

Plot 
Thennavan (Vijayakanth) is an honest and upright IAS officer and he is handpicked by the Prime Minister of India to be the Chief Election Commissioner of India. His first assignment is conducting the Indian general election in Tamil Nadu and for the election, he suggests passing five laws in order to fix the electoral system. Thennavan quickly gains the support of the public. The current Chief Minister of Tamil Nadu Ilanthiraiyan (Nassar), a corrupt and greedy politician who wants to win the next election, successfully convinces the Prime Minister to not pass the five laws. In the meantime, Divya (Kiran Rathod) falls in love with Thennavan and tries to convince him to marry her.

To win the election, Ilanthiraiyan orders Mustafa (Thalaivasal Vijay) to plant a bomb during one of his public meetings. As he expected, the bomb kills many innocent people. Ilanthiraiyan blames his enemies to have planned it and gains sympathy from the voters. During the polls, Thennavan finds out about the sham and stops the vote counting. An angry Ilanthiraiyan takes the matter to court. In court, Thennavan provides uncontested evidence and the culprits including Ilanthiraiyan are sentenced to life imprisonment. Divya eventually marries her lover Thennavan.

With Ilanthiraiyan in jail, his naive wife Pushpalatha (Urvasi) replaces him as the new chief minister and bails him out of jail. Thennavan is then arrested but Pushpalatha makes him release due to public pressure. After a small quarrel with her husband, Pushpalatha resigns from her function and her government is dismissed by the governor. With the election campaign going on full swing, Thennavan resigns from his position. He then holds a public meet: he urges the voters to boycott the election to save the country from corrupt politicians and to stop people who will try to vote. The day of the election, not a single vote has been cast and it is well received by the public. The prime minister praises Thennavan for his achievement and accepts to pass the five laws.

Cast 

 Vijayakanth as Thennavan IAS
 Kiran Rathod as Divya
 Nassar as Ilanthiraiyan
 Urvasi as Pushpalatha
 Ravichandran as Azhagarsamy, Thennavan's father
 Vivek as Dada Mani
 Ponnambalam as Inspector Arumugam
 Sriman as Auto rickshaw driver
 Mansoor Ali Khan as S. R. S.
 Raj Kapoor as Politician
 Krishnamoorthy as Krishnamoorthy
 Laxmi Rattan as Divya's father
 Thyagu as Viswanathan
 Thalaivasal Vijay as Mustafa
 Jayamani as Pakkiri
 Cell Murugan
 Thenali as Dada Mani's sidekick
 Chinrasu as Dada Mani's sidekick
 Benjamin as Dada Mani's sidekick
 LIC Narasimhan as Temple trustee
 Chelladurai as Politician
 Nellai Siva
 Set Govindaraj as Party member
 Mudhalvan Mahendran ad Director general of police
 R. N. R. Manohar as Nagappa
 S. N. Lakshmi as Thennavan's grandmother
 Indhu as Thennavan's mother
 Rajini Nivetha as Servant
 Vijaya Singh as Divya's mother
 Minnal Deepa as Jeni
 Theni Kunjarammal as Old woman
 Kovai Senthil as Mani's father
 Vijay Ganesh as Village doctor
 Vijay Easwaran as Henchman
 Bobby as Henchman
 Bayilvan Ranganathan
 Auditor Sridhar as Government employee
 Sivanarayanamoorthy as Police inspector
 S. Mani
 Sujibala as Nurse

Production 
The film is directed by debutant M. Nandakumar who has worked with directors like P. Vasu and Rajasekhar. R. N. R. Manohar, dialogue writer of this film appeared in a small role as a gangster who arrives to kill Vivek instead gets killed by him. Shooting for the film commenced in Chennai, and some fight scenes were picturised on top of highrise buildings like the Y.M.C.A and the Devi Theater, and on a set erected at the Prasad Studios. The hero and the unit at Prasad Studios had a surprise visitor in Cricketer Brian Lara. Lara had come for a friendly go-Kart competition and visited the sets to watch the shooting. Some scenes between the lead pair were picturised at the old Mahabalipuram road, while a song was picturised at sets erected at the AVM and Prasad Studios. Choreographed by Kala, the dance number had about a hundred dancers dancing around the lead pair. The song picturised at five sets, and shot with three cameras simultaneously, reportedly cost about Rs. 35 lakhs to picturise it. Yet another song was picturised with the lead pair at locations in and around Pollachi. Choreographed by Brinda, it took ten days to complete the picturisation. The fight scene between the hero and the jailor was filmed at Prasad Studios, where a lavish set of jail was erected at a cost of about Rs. 25 lakhs. While most of the shooting took place in Chennai and Pollachi, the unit also shot at locations in Jodhpur, Orissa and Visakhapatnam. For a single scene of a political meeting, about 5000 junior artistes were hired.

Soundtrack 

The music was composed by Yuvan Shankar Raja, who, for the first time, worked for a Vijayakanth film. The soundtrack, which was released on 7 August 2003, features 6 tracks with lyrics by Pa. Vijay, Na. Muthukumar, Snehan and Muthu Vijayan. Another soundtrack of Yuvan Shankar Raja, Kurumbu, was released on the same day.

Reception 
Hindu wrote: "Thennavan would have been a tailor-made story for Vijayakanth but for the flawed script, clichéd dialogue and unappealing caricatures. Somewhere down the line, everyone from the director and the hero seems to have lost interest".

References

External links
 

2003 films
2000s Tamil-language films
2000s action drama films
Indian action drama films
Films scored by Yuvan Shankar Raja
Films shot in Pollachi
Films shot in Chennai
Films shot in Rajasthan
Films shot in Odisha
Films shot in Visakhapatnam
2003 directorial debut films
2003 drama films